Sorrel is a reddish coat color in a horse lacking any black. It is a term that is usually synonymous with chestnut and one of the most common coat colors in horses. Some regions and breed registries distinguish it from chestnut, defining sorrel as a light, coppery shade, and chestnut as a browner shade.  However, in terms of equine coat color genetics there is no known difference between sorrel and chestnut.  Solid reddish-brown color is a base color of horses, caused by the recessive e gene.

The term "sorrel" probably comes from the color of the flower spike of the sorrel herb.    

In practice, in England and the east coast of the United States, all of these shades are usually called chestnut. The term "sorrel" is more common in the western United States.  The practical difference is most often not in color, but in usage: horses ridden in the Western tradition are more often referred to as sorrel and horses ridden in the English tradition are chestnut. The American Quarter Horse Association, which uses both terms, describes a sorrel as a type of copper-red chestnut, but allows that chestnut is also a correct term. Many organizations simply avoid the issue and choose one of the two terms to denote all reddish or brown colorations that are not bay.

Sorrel or chestnut coloration can be distinguished from dun, which results from different genetics, by the dun's slightly washed-out yellowish color, with a darker mane and tail than the rest of its coat, a narrow, dark line down the middle of the back, and possibly areas of darker color on the shoulder and forelegs.

The base shade of a sorrel is similar to that of a blood bay, but sorrel can always be distinguished from bay by the bay's black "points"—a black mane, tail and lower legs.    

Light-colored sorrels, sometimes called "blond sorrels," especially if they have flaxen manes and tails, may resemble a palomino.  However, true palomino coloration is the result of a horse's being heterozygous for the cream dilution gene.  

Some definitions list sorrel as a self color, used to describe only horses whose mane, tail, and legs are the same color as the rest of the coat, with the exception of white markings. Other definitions are broader and include reddish-brown horses with flaxen manes and tails.

References

  "Horse coat color tests" from the UC Davis Veterinary Genetics Lab
 "Introduction to Coat Color Genetics" from Veterinary Genetics Laboratory, School of Veterinary Medicine, University of California, Davis.  Web Site accessed January 12, 2008
  AQHA General Glossary

External links
 

Horse coat colors